Greek National Road 83 is a national highway of Greece. It connects Athens with Rafina via Marathon.

83
Roads in Attica